Maika may refer to:

People

Given name 
 Maika (wrestler), 舞華, Japanese professional wrestler

 Maika Elan (born 1986), Vietnam photographer
 Maika Felise, Samoan rugby league player
 Maika Friemann-Jennert (born 1964), German politician
 Maika Hamano (born 2004), Japanese football player
 Maika Monroe (born 1993), American actress
 Maika Makovski (born 1983), Spanish songwriter, singer
 Maika Ortiz (born 1991), Filipino volleyball player
 Maika Ozaki (tennis) (born 1984), Japanese tennis player
 Maika Ozaki (尾崎妹加, born 1991), Japanese wrestler
 Maika Rivera (born 1995), Filipino tennis player, model and actress
 Maika Sivo (born 1993), Fijian rugby league player
 Maika Ruyter-Hooley (born 1987), Australian football player
 Maika Yamamoto (山本 舞香, born 1997), Japanese actress and fashion model

Surname 
 Purakau Maika (1851/1852 – 4 August 1917) was a New Zealand newspaper editor and publisher

Fictional characters 
 Maika Chōno,  a character from Aikatsu Friends!
 Maika Halfwolf, the main character in the comic series Monstress
 Maika Sakuranomiya, a character from the Japanese manga and anime series Blend S
 Maika Tsuchimikado, a character from the Japanese manga and anime series A Certain Magical Index
 Maika Yoshikawa, a character from the Japanese manga and anime series Magikano

Other uses 
 Māika, a species of orchid native to eastern and southern Australia, New Zealand and New Caledonia
 AS Maïka, a football club in Uvira, Democratic Republic of Congo
 Maika Holdings, a Malaysian investment company
 Ngāti Maika II, a Iwi (tribe) in Māoridom

See also 
 Maik (disambiguation)
 Maike
 Majka
 Micah
 Mika

Feminine given names
Japanese feminine given names